Deshler Valley is a mostly ice-free valley between Spain Peak and Morse Spur in the Saint Johns Range of Victoria Land in Antarctica. The valley opens south to Victoria Valley. Named by the Advisory Committee on Antarctic Names in 2005 after Terry Deshler, Department of Atmospheric Science, University of Wyoming; United States Antarctic Program investigations addressing quantitative ozone loss and related research for 13 field seasons, from 1990 to 2004.

References

Valleys of Victoria Land